Josh Sapan (pronounced Sāpăn), born 1950, is a media executive who served as the President and Chief Executive Officer of AMC Networks, as well as the Executive Vice Chairman.

During his 35-year leadership of the company, 25 as CEO, Sapan has been credited with building a number of award-winning shows, movies and media brands. They include AMC's Mad Men; Breaking Bad and prequel Better Call Saul; The Walking Dead, which resulted in the expansion to 7 different Walking Dead themed TV series; IFC’s Portlandia; SundanceTV’s Rectify; and Bravo’s Inside the Actors Studio and Queer Eye for the Straight Guy. Bravo was sold to NBC, a division of GE for $1.25 billion in 2002. Sapan is credited with bringing independent films to wide audiences through IFC Films, which he led the launch of in 2000. At IFC Films he supported the early work of directors Barry Jenkins, Lena Dunham, Lynn Shelton, Christopher Nolan, Mira Nair, Noah Baumbach, Richard Linklater and Steven Soderbergh.

Sapan brought AMC Networks into the targeted streaming business with the launch of Doc Club in 2014, later rebranded Sundance Now, the horror genre streaming service Shudder in 2015, followed by the acquisition of the British Mystery themed Acorn TV, ALLBLK, the first streaming service created for Black film and TV, and AMC+.

Sapan led the overall management of the various businesses within AMC Networks, including the company's national television networks and subscription video on-demand services; AMC Studios, the company’s television production business; IFC Films, its independent film distribution business; AMC Networks International, the company's international programming business, as well as 25/7 Media Holdings LLC (formerly called Levity Live.)

During his tenure, AMC Networks has produced a number of award-winning and critically acclaimed shows with the company’s flagship channel AMC becoming the first basic cable network to win the Emmy Award for Outstanding Drama Series for Mad Men, and the only cable network to win the award four consecutive years, having been nominated 10 years in a row.

He has led AMC Networks since 1995, including its spin-off from Cablevision in 2011. Since becoming a public company, Sapan has presided over AMC Networks' increasing net revenues and operating income for seven consecutive years through fiscal year 2017.

Prior to the company's spin-off into AMC Networks, Sapan was president of Rainbow Media's National Entertainment Division (a subsidiary of Cablevision Systems Corporation) where he oversaw AMC and Bravo.

Life and education
Sapan was born to a Jewish family in Queens, New York. His father worked in advertising, and his mother was an Off Off Broadway actress. Sapan was raised in Brooklyn and attended P.S. 187. Sapan studied radio, television and film at the University of Wisconsin-Madison, but left school in 1970 moving to Boulder Colorado and later Berkeley California.

When he returned to college at UW-Madison, Sapan worked for a company that “four walled” films, taking 35 mm prints of wilderness films to theaters in small towns in Wisconsin which had been rented by the film company. He also acted with the Broom Street Theatre in plays such as Bertolt Brechts “The Exception and the Rule”, and in what may have been the first staging of the rock opera "Tommy". He performed at Broom Street opposite André De Shields who would later go on to star in "The Wiz" on Broadway. During this time, he also began collecting a substantial number of classic film posters discarded by theaters in Wisconsin.

At UW-Madison, Sapan led two film societies: The New Utrecht film society and Thor Film Society, New Utrecht showed foreign and art films such as "Woman in the Dunes" and "The Bicycle Thief", and Thor showed mainstream movies and college oriented fare, finding particular success with "Reefer Madness".

The film society experience led Sapan to purchase two 16 mm projectors and establish a mobile movie exhibition business in the Midwest, operating out of Athens Ohio, known as The Court Street Theatre.

After graduating from UW-Madison in 1975, Sapan returned to New York City and worked various jobs including as a labor union organizer for Local 1114 in the nursing home and hospital industry, which was later subsumed into Local 1199. He successfully organized The King James nursing home for that union.

During this time, Sapan read a book about the embryonic cable TV industry titled “The Wired Nation “which predicted the proliferation of cable TV content,” and began to volunteer at UA Columbia Cablevision in Wayne & Pompton townships New Jersey.

Sapan then sold a series of shows to the UA Columbia, producing and hosting a show called Student Film Review in which he interviewed and showed the short films of area filmmakers.

Career 
Sapan began his career in cable television at Tele-PrompTer Manhattan Cable TV, which later became Time Warner Cable.

He later joined the premium pay-TV service Showtime, where he led marketing, creative services and on-air programming promotion.

Rainbow Media 
In 1987, Sapan joined the National Entertainment Division of Rainbow Media, a programming subsidiary of Cablevision Systems Corporation, as president of AMC and Bravo, where he spearheaded the development of notable and culturally impactful programs including “Inside the Actors Studio” and “Queer Eye for the Straight Guy.”

He was named CEO of Rainbow Media in 1995.

During this time, Sapan was instrumental in bringing independent film to wide audiences with the creation of independent film distribution label IFC Films and the introduction of day-and-date movie releases.

Since its inception in 2000, IFC Films has produced or released more than 1,000 films in the U.S., including those of filmmakers including Lena Dunham's "Tiny Furniture", Christopher Nolan's "Following", Barry Jenkins' "Medicine for Melancholy", Jennifer Kent's "The Babadook", Mira Nair's "Monsoon Wedding", Steve Soderbergh's "Gay's Anatomy", and Suzanne Bier's "Brothers", who the company would later go on to work with on the award-winning AMC miniseries “The Night Manager".

The label won its first Academy Award in 2000 for Kimberly Pierce's “Boys Don’t Cry,” for Best Actress in a Leading Role for Hilary Swank's performance.

Under Sapan, Rainbow Media launched WE tv and IFC (Independent Film Channel), and in 2002, sold Bravo to NBC for $1.25 billion in stock and cash.

In 2005, Sapan opened New York City's IFC Center, the brick-and-mortar home for the IFC Films brand and home to DOC NYC, the largest documentary film festival in the United States.

In 2006, Sapan led AMC's expansion into scripted original programming with the launch of “Broken Trail” starring Robert Duvall on Sunday, June 25, the highest rated telecast in network history and the number one cable telecast of the year. The mini-series went on to be among the most watched program in cable that year and later garnered 4 Primetime Emmy Awards in 2007.

That same year Sapan oversaw the debut of AMC's “Mad Men,” to widespread critical acclaim with the series going on to win 16 Emmys and 5 Golden Globes over the course of its run. The show was followed shortly after by the premiere of “Breaking Bad” in January 2008, the most critically acclaimed show of all time according to Guinness World Records.

In May 2008, Sapan led the company's acquisition of Sundance Channel from General Electric Company's NBC Universal, CBS Corporation's Showtime Networks, and entities controlled by Robert Redford. Under Sapan's leadership, Sundance Channel expanded into original programming with series such as Carlos, Rectify, Top of the Lake and The Honorable Woman.

In 2010, Sapan led the creation of AMC Studios, the company's in-house production and distribution arm. AMC Studios’ first production was “The Walking Dead,” which debuted on AMC on October 31, 2010, and went on to become the highest-rated series in television history and the most watched show on ad-supported cable for 10 consecutive years.

AMC Networks 
Sapan led the company's spin-off from Cablevision Systems Corporation and in June 2011 AMC Networks began trading as a separate public company on the NASDAQ stock exchange.

In 2014, Sapan expanded the company's footprint with the acquisition of Liberty Global's international channels portfolio. In 2014, the company also entered into a partnership agreement with BBC Worldwide (now called BBC Studios) to acquire a 49.9% stake in the BBC AMERICA cable channel, giving AMC Networks operational control of the channel.

Under Sapan, AMC Networks has become “a beacon of groundbreaking and pioneering original content,” behind several of what are widely “considered some of the best shows of all time”, including “The Walking Dead,” “Breaking Bad,” “Better Call Saul” and “Mad Men.” AMC Studios has expanded its slate to include series such as AMC's Fear the Walking Dead, The Terror and The Night Manager, as well as SundanceTV's Rectify.

During his time at the helm, AMC drama's set television records: In 2013, Breaking Bad had the third most watched series finale in cable history and in 2014, with 17.3 million viewers, “The Walking Dead’s” season five premiere was the highest rated show in cable television history. Overall, the series has been the most watched show on ad-supported cable for 10 years.

In 2014, Sapan helmed the premier of the Peabody Award-winning miniseries, The Honourable Woman, on SundanceTV, and led the release of the AMC Networks-funded Boyhood, a critically acclaimed movie from director Richard Linklater that was filmed over 12 years. The film garnered six Oscar nominations including Best Picture, Best Director and for Best Original Screenplay and won the Oscar for Best Supporting Actress for the performance of Patricia Arquette.

In the following years, Sapan continued the company's original programming with the Emmy Award-winning BBC America series “Killing Eve,” as well as AMC's “Breaking Bad” follow-up “Better Call Saul.” The company has also been the American home to BBC's Emmy Award-winning natural history series including “Planet Earth II,” “Blue Planet II,” “Dynasties,” and “Seven Worlds, One Planet.”

Under Sapan, AMC Networks was an early creator of targeted subscription video on demand services. In 2014, Sapan led the company's launch of Doc Club, now called Sundance Now, dedicated to true crime, thrillers and dramas followed by the 2015 launch of horror-focused streaming service Shudder. In 2018, Sapan led AMC Networks’ acquisition of RLJ Entertainment, home to streaming services Acorn TV, specializing in mysteries and drama, and UMC (now ALLBLK), the first streaming destination dedicated to Black audiences.

In 2018, Sapan also led the acquisition of Levity Live and he led AMC Networks to join 21st Century Fox and Sky Plc in a $75 million funding round for sports TV service FuboTV.

In May 2020, the company announced the acquisition of the works of Anne Rice including The Vampire Chronicles and The Mayfair Witches. AMC Networks will hold the rights to develop the works under the AMC Studios umbrella, as well as external partner licensing, with Anne Rice and son Christopher Rice serving as executive producers on all series and films. 

Sapan oversaw the creation of AMC Networks’ two subscription video on demand bundles, AMC+ and WE tv+, which launched in June 2020 on Comcast's Xfinity platform. AMC+ includes series from AMC and sister networks like SundanceTV and IFC, ad-free with early premieres on demand, along with the streaming services Shudder, Sundance Now, and IFC Films Unlimited. WE tv+, features programming from the company's reality network WE tv and the UMC streaming service. Later in 2020, AMC Networks expanded the bundles to customers of DISH and Sling TV followed by Amazon Prime Video Channels and Apple TV channels.

Sapan will continue to produce six independent films for IFC in 2023-2024.

Theater 
Sapan has personally owned and operated the Greenport Theatre in Greenport, NY on the north fork of Long Island since he purchased it in 2004.

Upon its purchase, Sapan renovated the theatre to restore and keep the elements from its 1939 architectural origins.

The Theatre is open for the summer season where it has an annual art exhibit. It is also home to the Manhattan Film Institute's North Fork Summer Workshop where more than 25 short films from aspiring creators premiere each year and the North Fork Television Festival for independent television content.

The street front poster cases feature art made by students at local schools.

Every year the theatre is also provided at no cost to the community for its annual Maritime Festival as well as for classic movie screenings during the winter months.

Writing & Collections
Sapan is the author of The Big Picture: America in Panorama (Princeton Architectural Press), a collection of panoramic photos from the 20th century. Sapan is also a published poet and will release “RX,” a book of poetry by Red Hen Press in November 2023.

In 2022, Sapan wrote and published a book, ”Third Act: Reinventing Your Next Chapter” focusing on what extraordinary people do when they reach what has conventionally been thought of as retirement age. The book profiles 60 people such as Gloria Steinem, Majority Whip James Clyburn, Jane Fonda, Rita Moreno, Robert Redford, Norman Lear and Alan Alda. Others include Hope Harley, founder of The Bronx Children’s Museum, Paul Dillon, who founded an incubator for new business for war veterans, and Steve Javie, NBA referee-turned-deacon. In its first week the book was the #1 best-selling photo essay book on Amazon.

Sapan has the world's largest collection of antique lightning rods, a selection of which is on permanent display at the Franklin Institute in Philadelphia.

Community Involvement 
Sapan expanded his career’s work into philanthropic efforts; he developed a program highlighting the work of neurodiverse artists. Partnering with the Museum of the Moving Image in Queens, NY, Sapan launched “Marvels of Media“ in May 2022 with an exhibition, awards ceremony, and festival celebrating autistic media-makers. For its inaugural year, more than 3,000 entries were received from 117 countries.

In addition, Sapan works with The Fortune Society in New York, focusing on people who have been previously incarcerated and learning how to successfully reenter the workforce. In September 2022, Sapan became an “Executive in Residence” at Columbia University’s Graduate Business School.

Affiliations
Sapan serves on numerous boards, including The American Film Institute (AFI), Museum of the Moving Image, People for the American Way, WNYC Radio, New School University and The Public Theatre. Sapan is a member of the Academy of Motion Picture Arts and Sciences Executive Branch.

Awards
 Fast Company's 100 Most Creative People in Business
Cable Hall of Fame, 2013
 Broadcasting & Cable Hall of Fame, 2008
 National Cable & Telecommunications Association Vanguard Award for Programmers, 2010
 National Cable & Telecommunications Association Vanguard Award for Distinguished Leadership, 2015 
 CTAM's Grand TAM Award and Chairman's Award, 2005
 Association of Cable Communicators'(ACC) President's Award, 1997
 PROMAX Brand Builder Award, 2004
 T. Howard Foundation's Executive Leadership Award, 2009
 Paley Prize for Innovation and Excellence, 2012
 Vanity Fair: New Establishment Issue
 Vanity Fair: The Impresarios of Cable's Golden Age, 2013
 Multichannel News Executive of the Year, 2013
NATPE's Brandon Tartikoff Legacy Award, 2016
 Media Institute's Freedom of Speech Award

References

External links

AMC Networks
Living people
American television executives
20th-century American Jews
1951 births
University of Wisconsin–Madison alumni
People for the American Way people
Place of birth missing (living people)
20th-century American businesspeople
American chief executives
21st-century American Jews